Gordon Munro Bryant (3 August 1914 – 14 January 1991) was an Australian politician. He was a member of the Australian Labor Party (ALP) and represented the Division of Wills in Victoria from 1955 to 1980. He served as Minister for Aboriginal Affairs (1972–1973) and Minister for the Capital Territory (1973–1975) in the Whitlam Government.

Early life
Bryant was born on 3 August 1914 in Lismore, Victoria. He was the son of Agnes Keith (née Bain) and Donald Munro Bryant. His father, a storekeeper and farmer, was the nephew of Victorian premier James Munro.

Bryant moved to Baxter as a child and attended Frankston High School. He won a teaching scholarship and taught at Callaghan Creek (near Mitta Mitta), Pearcedale, and Mittyack. His teaching career was interrupted by the Second World War,  but after the war's end he became a high school teacher at Upwey. He completed a Bachelor of Arts (Hons.) at the University of Melbourne in 1950, having also studied at Melbourne Teachers' College before the war.

Military service
Bryant enlisted in the Citizen Military Force in 1934. He was called up for full-time duty in 1942 and was transferred to the Australian Imperial Force (AIF) in January 1943. He remained in Australia until 1945, when he participated in the Battle of Balikpapan as a captain in the 2/33rd Battalion.

Politics
Bryant was elected to Parliament in 1955.  A passionate supporter of land rights, he was president of the Aborigines Advancement League for seven years, from 1957 to 1964.

After seventeen years in Parliament, Bryant joined the Cabinet of Prime Minister Gough Whitlam, becoming Minister for Aboriginal Affairs in 1972.  A year later he became Minister for the Capital Territory.  As Minister for Aboriginal Affairs, he was instrumental in the Whitlam Government's historic land rights deal with Vincent Lingiari and the Gurindji people.  Bryant retired in 1980, and his electorate was taken over by future Prime Minister Bob Hawke. Bryant had earlier resisted pressure to retire early in order to expedite Hawke's entry to Parliament via a by-election.

Personal life
Bryant died in January 1991, eleven months prior to Hawke's ousting as Prime Minister.

He is survived by his wife, Pat, who died in 2003, and two sons, Robin and Linton.

References

Australian House of Representatives HANSARD, "DEATH OF HON. G.M. BRYANT, E.D.", 1991-02-12 (excerpt available online).
"PM lent hand to land rights", Karen Middleton, The West Australian, 2004-01-01.

 

1914 births
1991 deaths
Military personnel from Victoria (Australia)
Australian Army personnel of World War II
Australian Army officers
1975 Australian constitutional crisis
Australian Labor Party members of the Parliament of Australia
Australian schoolteachers
Members of the Australian House of Representatives for Wills
Members of the Australian House of Representatives
Members of the Cabinet of Australia
20th-century Australian politicians
20th-century Australian military personnel